Tradin' Paint is the name of two separate television programs on the U.S.-based cable network Speed Channel.

In 2003, Tradin' Paint was the name of a one-hour special program where 4-time NASCAR Winston Cup champion Jeff Gordon and former CART champion and Formula One driver Juan Pablo Montoya traded race cars and drove around the Indianapolis Motor Speedway Formula One race course. The show was hosted by Bob Varsha, along with Fox Sports's NASCAR commentator Larry McReynolds and Speed's Formula One commentator Steve Matchett.

Starting in 2006, Tradin' Paint is the name of a weekly discussion program broadcast from each week's NASCAR Nextel Cup venue. Hosted by Michael Waltrip and John Roberts, the programs showcases Waltrip debating various NASCAR topics with a local media representative. The show is currently hosted by Roberts and Kyle Petty. It is a spiritual successor to the controversial Pit Bull. In 2009, it was announced that the series would not return for another season and a game show hosted by Roberts involving NASCAR fans at the racetrack would answer NASCAR related questions, named NASCAR Smarts sponsored by Ask.com would take its place.
The phrase 'trading paint' is a colloquialism for the event when 2 racing automobiles bump against one another often causing the paint from each vehicle to be transposed onto the other. The origin of the phrase is often attributed to  cameraman Douglas Forbush during a 1982 broadcast from Stafford Motor Speedway in Stafford Connecticut.

External links
Description of the 2003 Tradin' Paint special on Speed Channel's website.
Description of the 2006 Tradin' Paint program on Speed Channel's website.

Automotive television series